Sir John Glynne, 6th Baronet (1713 – 1 July 1777) was a Welsh politician and landowner.

Glynne was the third son of Sir Stephen Glynne, 3rd Baronet, and succeeded to the baronetcy after the successive deaths of his father and elder brothers in 1729 and 1730. In November of the latter year, he matriculated from The Queen's College, Oxford.

Sir John stood as Member of Parliament for Flint in 1734, but was defeated after spending £35,000 on the election. However, in 1741, he was elected MP for Flintshire, which he represented until 1747.

In 1751, Glynne was High Sheriff of Flintshire, and in 1752, built Hawarden Castle on his estate. He was returned to Parliament again for Flint in 1753, and represented that constituency for the rest of his life. He was made a D.C.L. by Oxford in 1763.

In 1731, he married the heiress Honora Conway, by which match he almost doubled his estates at Hawarden. They had thirteen children:
a son, died young
John Conway Glynne (died 7 May 1773), m. S. Crewe
Honora Glynne, died unmarried
Sophia Glynne, married John Yorke of Bewerley, without surviving issue
Penelope Glynne, married Sir William Earle Welby, 1st Baronet
Catherine Glynne, died unmarried
Rev. Sir Stephen Glynne, 7th Baronet (1744–1780)
William Glynne
Anne Glynne
Frances Glynne, married Rev. Randolph Crewe
Francis Glynne
Lucy Glynne, married James Gordon
Mary Glynne, married Simon Gordon

His wife Honora died in 1769, and Glynne remarried on 27 March 1772 to Augusta Beaumont, by whom he had no children. He died suddenly in 1777 and was succeeded by his son, Rev. Stephen Glynne, his elder son John Conway Glynne having died in 1773.

References

1713 births
1777 deaths
Alumni of The Queen's College, Oxford
Baronets in the Baronetage of England
British MPs 1741–1747
British MPs 1747–1754
British MPs 1754–1761
British MPs 1761–1768
British MPs 1768–1774
British MPs 1774–1780
Members of the Parliament of Great Britain for Welsh constituencies
People from Hawarden
High Sheriffs of Flintshire